Killester Basketball Club is an Irish basketball club based in Dublin. Established in 1967 by Michael Casey, Killester is one of the oldest and most successful civilian basketball clubs in Ireland. The club's senior men's and women's representative teams both play in Ireland's top national leagues.

Killester have training and playing facilities at St. David's CBS in Artane and St. Fintan's High School in Sutton. The Super League teams play their home games at the IWA Sports Hall in Clontarf.

History
In 1973, Killester BC entered a men's team into the Irish National League for the competition's inaugural season. Between 1975 and 1977, Killester won three championships in a row. In 1978, a women's competition was established, and a Killester women's side won the competition's first two titles.

Since 2001 the Killester men won five championships and four National Cup titles. The women also managed four National Cup titles in 2002, 2005, 2020 and 2023.

Achievements
 8× Irish Men's National League champions: 1975, 1976, 1977, 2001, 2007, 2010, 2011, 2014
 5× Irish Men's National Cup champions: 1987, 2001, 2008, 2010, 2019
 2× Irish Women's National League champions: 1979, 1980
 4× Irish Women's National Cup champions: 2002, 2005, 2020, 2023

Notable past players
 Michael Bonaparte
 Mario Elie
 Michael Goj
 Kenny Perkins
 Kelvin Troy
/ Jermaine Turner

References

External links

Killester
Super League (Ireland) teams
Basketball teams in County Dublin